South Likupang (Likupang Selatan) is a district in North Minahasa Regency, North Sulawesi Province, Indonesia with a population of 4,958.

Within its boundaries is the Batu, Kaweruan, Kokoleh I, Kokoleh II, Paslaten, Wangurer and Werot villages.

References

See also 
West Likupang
East Likupang

Populated places in North Sulawesi